Mivirus is a genus of negative-strand RNA viruses which infect arthropods. Member viruses have nonsegmented and bisegmented genomes. There are nine species in the genus.

Etymology 

Genome 

Miviruses have nonsegmented and bisegmented genomes which are linear. Some member viruses may have circular genomes.

Taxonomy

The following species are recognized:

Mivirus amblyommae
Mivirus boleense
Mivirus changpingense
Mivirus dermacentoris
Mivirus genovaense
Mivirus karukeraense
Mivirus rhipicephali
Mivirus suffolkense
Mivirus wuhanense

References

Virus genera
Negarnaviricota